The Silver Slipper Stakes is an Australian Turf Club Group 2 Thoroughbred horse race for horses aged two years old, over a distance of 1100 metres. It is held annually at Rosehill Racecourse in Sydney, Australia. The race is regarded as a traditional lead up race for the Golden Slipper Stakes. Total prizemoney is A$250,000.

History

The following thoroughbreds captured the Silver Slipper – Golden Slipper double: Eskimo Prince (1964), Baguette (1970), Luskin Star  (1977), Pierro (2012), Mossfun (2014), She Will Reign (2017), Farnan (2020)

Distance
1963–1969 - 4 furlongs (~800 metres)
1970 held - 5 furlongs (~1000 metres)
1971–1972 - 4 furlongs (~800 metres)
1973–1983 - 900 metres
1984 onwards held over 1100 metres.

Grade
1963–1978 - Principal Race
1979 onwards - Group 2

Venue
1991 - Canterbury Park Racecourse

Winners

 2023 - Cylinder
 2022 - Best Of Bordeaux
 2021 - Home Affairs
 2020 - Farnan
 2019 - Time To Reign
 2018 - Sunlight
 2017 - She Will Reign
 2016 - Astern
 2015 - Headwater
 2014 - Mossfun
 2013 - Sweet Idea
 2012 - Pierro
 2011 - Satin Shoes
 2010 - Chance Bye
 2009 - Melito
 2008 - Amelia’s Dream
 2007 - Shaft
 2006 - Plagiarize
 2005 - Domesday
 2004 - Ballybleue
 2003 - Hasna
 2002 - Victory Vein
 2001 - Excellerator
 2000 - French Braids
 1999 - Passmore
 1998 - Iglesia
 1997 - †race not held
 1996 - Millward
 1995 - Clang
 1994 - Strategic
 1993 - Dapper Magic
 1992 - Gold Brose
 1991 - Kenfair
 1990 - Honey Be Quick
 1989 - Triscay
 1988 - Show County
 1987 - Ballook
 1986 - Maizcay
 1985 - Pre Catelan
 1984 - Kisses For Kathy
 1983 - Giostra
 1982 - Been There
 1981 - Vaindarra
 1980 - Black Shoes
 1979 - Fiancee
 1978 - Mersing
 1977 - Inventive
 1976 - Luskin Star
 1975 - Rainbeam
 1974 - St. Louis Belle
 1973 - Royal Britannia
 1972 - Jewel Thief
 1971 - Sovereign Slipper
 1970 - Regal Gauntlet
 1969 - Baguette
 1968 - Gaelic Spirit
 1967 - Topmost
 1966 - Tod Maid
 1965 - Very Merry
 1964 - Peace Council
 1963 - Eskimo Prince

† Not raced in calendar year due to change of schedule as race moved from spring to late summer

See also
 List of Australian Group races
 Group races

External links 
First three placegetters Silver Slipper Stakes (ATC)

References

Horse races in Australia